The men's individual competition of the archery events at the 2011 Pan American Games was held between October 17 and 22 at the Pan American Archery Stadium. The defending Pan American Games champion was Adrián Puentes of Cuba. While the Pan American Championship, champion is William Brady also of the United States.

Schedule
All times are Central Standard Time (UTC-6).

Results

Ranking round

Competition rounds

Finals

Top half

Bottom half

References

Archery at the 2011 Pan American Games